The 1993–94 London Crusaders season was the fourteenth in the club's history. It was their third season under the name of the London Crusaders, after more than a decade under the Fulham RLFC name. They competed in the 1993–94 Second Division of the Rugby Football League. They also competed in the 1993–94 Challenge Cup and the 1993–94 League Cup. They finished the season in 3rd place in the second tier of British professional rugby league.

Second Division table

References

External links
Rugby League Project

London Broncos seasons
London Broncos season
1993 in rugby league by club
1993 in English rugby league
London Broncos season
1994 in rugby league by club
1994 in English rugby league